Norm is a masculine given name, most often a short form (hypocorism) of Norman. People named Norm include:

 Norm Abram (born 1949), carpenter on the television show This Old House
 Norm Chow (born 1946), American football coach
 Norm Cox (American football) (1925–2008), American football quarterback
 Norm Daniels (born 1942), American healthcare and public health ethicist,
 Norm Harvey (1899–1941), American football player
 Norm Kelly (born 1941), Canadian politician
 Norm Kelly (Australian politician) (born 1959)
 Norm Macdonald (disambiguation)
 Norm Maciver (born 1964), Canadian National Hockey League executive and former player
 Norm Miller (born 1956), Canadian politician
 Norm Miller (baseball) (born 1946), American Major League baseball player
 Norm Neeson (1934–2020), Australian rules footballer
 Norm Nixon (born 1955), American basketball player
 Norm Oliver (footballer, born 1885) (1885–1938), Australian rules footballer
 Norm Oliver (footballer, born 1922) (1922–1944), Australian rules footballer
 Norm Peterson, fictional character in the U.S. TV series Cheers 
 Norm Sherry (1931–2021), American catcher, manager, and coach in Major League Baseball
 Norm Smith (1915–1973), Australian rules football player and coach
 Norm Smith (footballer born 1946), Australian rules footballer
 Norm Smith (rugby union) ( 1899–1971), Australian rugby union player
 Norm Wells (born 1957), American football player

Masculine given names
English masculine given names
Hypocorisms